The 2017–18 season is Zamalek's 59th season in the Egyptian Premier League and 59th consecutive season in the top flight of Egyptian football. The club will participate in the Egyptian Premier League, Egypt Cup and the CAF Confederation Cup.

Friendlies

Players

Current first team squad

(3rd captain)

(captain)

 

(4th captain )

(2nd captain)

Out on loan

Youth academy squad

2017–18 Egyptian Premier League

Position

Results

Results by round

Match details

References

Zamalek SC seasons
Zamalek